Piano is a 1990 play by Trevor Griffiths, adapted from the 1977 film An Unfinished Piece for Mechanical Piano, itself based on the incomplete and untitled early Anton Chekhov play usually known as Platonov. It premiered at the Royal National Theatre.

References 

Plays based on works by Anton Chekhov
Plays based on films
1990 plays